A praelector is a traditional role at the University of Cambridge and the University of Oxford. The role differs somewhat between the two ancient universities.

University of Cambridge
At Cambridge, a praelector is the fellow of a college who formally presents students during their matriculation and the graduation ceremony at Cambridge, especially during the Congregation of the Regent House when degrees are conferred. The praelector is also vicariously responsible for a student's actions and can be punished for those actions.

University of Oxford
At Oxford, a praelector may be a fellow of the college, but may also be a college tutor who is responsible for running an honours school in the absence of a fellow. A praelector may also hold a college fellowship.

External links 
 Praelector information at Sidney Sussex College, Cambridge

Terminology of the University of Cambridge
Terminology of the University of Oxford
Titles